Roberto Quaglia (born 17 May 1962) is an Italian science fiction writer. Many of his works have been translated and published in Romania, and some have also been translated into English, Russian, Spanish, French, Czech, Hungarian and Dutch.

Life and career
Quaglia has held a variety of jobs, among them photographer, owner and barman of a pub, internet entrepreneur and politician.  From the beginning of 1995 to the end of 1997 he was a Councilor in Genoa.  Since 1989, he has been active in science fiction fandom. He has over a number of years occasionally written articles for the Science Fact & Science Fiction Concatenation, the SF zine that has won the most Eurocon Awards.   Between 2002 and 2013 was vice-chairman of the European Science Fiction Society, the organization which coordinates the annual Eurocon science fiction convention.

In 1994 he became friends with American science fiction writer Robert Sheckley. In 1999 he and Sheckley traveled together around Europe for over a month, the first of a number of long journeys they took together. Some of Quaglia's articles, videos and photographs of these trips can be found on the Internet.  In 2004, Quaglia and Sheckley began planning to write two books together, a project which became public a few months before Sheckley's death, in an article published by the Ukrainian press during Sheckley's last journey, a tour of the Ukraine together with Quaglia. Sheckley's death put an end to this project.

In 2003, Quaglia and British writer Ian Watson met and became friends, which led to a literary collaboration. Together they wrote the collection of My Beloved stories, some of which are available on the Internet, having been published by Helix SF, Flurb and in the United States, Clarkesworld Magazine. Other stories have been published in the American magazine Weird Tales, the Canadian anthology Lust For Life, New Writings in the Fantastic, several Mammoth Books of Best New Erotica: Volume 7, Volume 9 and  Best of Best New Erotica, and in other books.  In 2009 these stories were collected into an anthology, The Beloved of My Beloved, published by NewCon Press, and launched in March–April 2009 at the Eurocon in Fiuggi and the Eastercon in Bradford.

Awards and honors
2009 - Eurocon ESFS Award for Best European Writer
2010 - BSFA Award for best short story for "The Beloved Time of Their Life"

Works
Novels
 1994:  Vagabondul interspaţial ("The Vagabond of Ether"). :ro:Nemira. 
 2002: Bread, Butter and Paradoxine. Solid. 
 2009: Paradoxine: The Adventures of James Vagabond (revised edition of Bread, Butter and Paradoxine). Immanion Press. , 
 2011: Jonathan Livingshit Pigeon: A Tail of Transcendence. Eagle Publishing House. 

Other fiction
 1992: Somebody up there is lusting for me – science fiction play (distributed as a free gift to all attenders of Eurocon 1993 in Jersey)
 1998:  God Ltd (Italian: "Dio S.r.l.") – short stories collection,  Nemira.
 2009: with Ian Watson: The Beloved of My Beloved – short stories collection, NewconPress.  (hardcover),   (paperback), re-published as an ebook in 2011 by Gollancz, 

Non-fiction
 1995: The future of science fiction – essay (in the official Souvenir Book of Intersection, the 53rd World Science Fiction Convention, Glasgow)
 2003:  Pensiero stocastico ("Stochastic Thought") – essay collection :it: Delos Books
2004:  Gandirea Stocastica :ro: Nemira
 2003:  "Tutto quello che avreste sempre voluto sapere sull'11 settembre 2001, ma che non avete mai osato chiedervi" ("Everything you wanted to know about September 11, but have never dared to ask yourself") – essay, in Tutto quello che sai è falso. Manuale dei segreti e delle bugie. NuoviMondiMedia.  (Italian edition of Everything You Know Is Wrong Russ Kick, ed.)
 2006:  Il Mito dell'11 Settembre e l'Opzione Dottor Stranamore ("The September 11th Myth and the Doctor Strangelove Option"). PonSinMor. 
2009:  11 Septembrie, Mitul. Editura Stefan.<ref>[http://www.11septembriemitul.com/ 11 Septembrie, Mitul]</ref> 
2011:The Myth of September 11: The Satanic Verses of Western Democracy. Eagle Publishing House. 
 2011: Avatar: The New Fantastic Horizons of Oneiric Justice'' – essay (in No.267 of Vector, the critical journal of the British Science Fiction Association)

References
Notes

External links
"The Beloved Time of Their Lives", The text of the 2009 BSFA Award-winning short story
"El amor de sus vidas", Spanish translation of the text of the 2009 BSFA Award-winning short story, published by :es: Axxon

Italian science fiction writers
Italian male non-fiction writers
1962 births
Living people
Italian speculative fiction critics